Koło (during the German occupation called Wartbrücken in 1940–41, Warthbrücken in 1941–45) is a town on the Warta River in central Poland with 23,101 inhabitants (2006). It is situated in the Greater Poland Voivodship (since 1999), having previously been in Konin Voivodship (1975–1998), and it is the capital of Koło County.

History 

Koło is one of the oldest towns in Poland. It was granted town status in 1362 by King Casimir III. It was situated in a safe place near the royal castle, on the island in the branches of the Warta River; the town had no walls but only two gates. It was a royal city and the seat of a land county (starostwo niegrodowe).[p. 16–18]

In 1410 Koło was a gathering place of the Greater Poland nobility, which called for a war with the Teutonic Order (see Battle of Grunwald). In 1452 the Royal Castle in Koło was the place of meeting between King Casimir the Jagiellonian and the representatives of the Prussian Union (see: the Thirteen Years' War).

From the early 15th century until 1716, Koło was the meeting place of the Provincial Parliament called Sejmik Generalny for the Greater Poland region, comprising the Poznań Voivodship, Kalisz, Sieradz, Łęczyca, Brześć Kujawski and Inowrocław Voivodeships. The town evolved into a regional hub of trade and crafts especially in metals and textiles, and as a centre of pottery. In 1571 a contract was drafted with regard to the status of the Jews in Koło, in which the city's Christians have undertaken to provide protection to the Jews, in return for which the Jews were required pay a special annual municipal tax.

Koło was destroyed twice, once in 1622 by the Lisowski forces, and in 1655 by the Swedes; the economy managed to revive only at the end of the 17th century. Until 1793 Koło belonged to Konin County of the Kalisz Voivodeship of the Greater Poland Province of the Polish Crown. Following the Second Partition of Poland, in the years 1793-1806 it was occupied by Prussia, but during the Kościuszko insurrection in 1794 it was temporarily liberated by the insurgents. In the years 1807–1815 it belonged to the Duchy of Warsaw and later to Congress Poland.

20th century

After the return of Poland's sovereignty at the end of World War I, Koło was assigned to Łódź Voivodeship. A new railway line opened in 1921 from Kutno to Strzałkowo via Koło. In the early 20th century, the Jewish population of Koło made up almost 50 percent of the total population.

On September 2, 1939, during Nazi Germany's invasion of Poland, the Luftwaffe bombed a civilian evacuation train from Krotoszyn, killing almost 250 civilians. The Germans captured Koło on September 18, 1939. On September 19, Jewish males over the age of 14 were rounded up and sent to forced labour. The Jewish synagogue was set on fire the following day. Many Poles were arrested and imprisoned in the local prison, and afterwards murdered in Rzuchów. On November 11, 1939, the German police murdered there 80 people, who were previously imprisoned in Koło. In November 1939, Poles from Koło were also murdered in other places, including Bugaj, Chełmno nad Nerem, Konin.

The first Aktion, conducted by Wehrmacht soldiers and gendarmes, took place in December 1939, in which 100 Jews were executed. In June 1940 the Germans expelled 514 Poles, merchants and craftsmen with entire families, mostly to the General Government, while some were deported to forced labour to Germany, and their houses, workshops and shops were handed over to German colonists in accordance to the Nazi Lebensraum policy. In December 1940, the Jews were rounded up in a ghetto, which was liquidated the following year, in December 1941. The remaining Jews were deported to Chełmno extermination camp, where they were killed in gas vans and buried in mass graves. Koło remained a transfer point for Jews deported to Łódź, and Nazi officials, including Heinrich Himmler, visited the town.

In World War II the town was renamed to Warthbrücken (which translates to "bridge on Warta river")

Climate 
The climate is oceanic (Köppen: Cfb), but using older data and the modified Trewartha classification the climate would be continental (Dc).

Sports

Olimpia Koło – football team (3rd league 1960, 1963–1965)
Maratończyk Koło – korfball team. Champion of Poland.

Notable residents
Franciszek Ksawery Dmochowski – novelist, poet, translator, publisher, critic, and satirist
Tomasz Kos – football player (FC Erzgebirge Aue)
Jan Pusty – retired hurdler
Aron Brand – pediatric cardiologist
George Chapman (murderer) – serial killer
Meir Auerbach – chief Ashkenazi rabbi of Jerusalem

International relations

Twin towns – Sister cities 
Koło is twinned with:
 Reinbek
 Ladyzhyn

References

External links
Koło official website

Cities and towns in Greater Poland Voivodeship
Koło County
Kalisz Governorate
Poznań Voivodeship (1921–1939)
Holocaust locations in Poland
Jewish communities destroyed in the Holocaust